Lincoln Township is an inactive township in Clark County, in the U.S. state of Missouri.

Lincoln Township was established in 1868, taking the name of President Abraham Lincoln.

References

Townships in Missouri
Townships in Clark County, Missouri